The ice hockey team rosters at the 2002 Winter Olympics for the women's tournament consisted of the following players:

Canada
Dana Antal, Kelly Bechard, Jennifer Botterill, Thérèse Brisson, Cassie Campbell, Isabelle Chartrand, Lori Dupuis, Danielle Goyette, Geraldine Heaney, Jayna Hefford, Becky Kellar, Caroline Ouellette, Cherie Piper, Cheryl Pounder, Tammy Lee Shewchuk, Sami Jo Small, Colleen Sostorics, Kim St-Pierre, Vicky Sunohara, Hayley Wickenheiser

China
Chen Jing, Dai Qiuwa, Guan Weinan, Guo Hong, Hu Chunrong, Jin Fengling, Li Xuan, Liu Hongmei, Liu Yanhui, Lu Yan, Ma Xiaojun, Sang Hong, Shen Tiantian, Sun Rui, Wang Linuo, Wang Ying, Xu Lei, Yang Xiuqing, Zhang Jing

Finland
 Head Coach:  Jouko Lukkarila
<noinclude>

Germany
Maritta Becker, Tina Evers, Steffi Frühwirt, Claudia Grundmann, Sandra Kinza, Sabrina Kruck, Michaela Lanzl, Nina Linde, Christina Oswald, Franziska Reindl, Nina Ritter, Sabine Rückauer, Anja Scheytt, Jana Schreckenbach, Esther Thyssen, Maren Valenti, Stephanie Wartosch-Kürten, Julia Wierscher, Raffi Wolf, Nina Ziegenhals

Kazakhstan
Viktoriya Adyeva, Lyubov Alekseyeva, Antonida Asonova, Dinara Dikambayeva, Tatyana Khlyzova, Olga Konysheva, Olga Kryukova, Nadezhda Loseva, Svetlana Maltseva, Yekaterina Maltseva, Olga Potapova, Viktoriya Sazonova, Yelena Shtelmayster, Yuliya Solovyova, Oksana Taykevich, Nataliya Trunova, Lyubov Vafina, Svetlana Vasina, Nataliya Yakovchuk

Russia
The following is the Russia women's national ice hockey team roster for the women's ice hockey tournament at the 2002 Winter Olympics.

Head coach:  Viacheslav Dolgushin    Assistant coach:  Andrey Anisimov,  Igor Prusov

Sweden
Annica Åhlén, Lotta Almblad, Anna Andersson, Gunilla Andersson, Emelie Berggren, Kristina Bergstrand, Ann-Louise Edstrand, Joa Elfsberg, Erika Holst, Nanna Jansson, Maria Larsson, Ylva Lindberg, Ulrica Lindström, Kim Martin Hasson, Josefin Pettersson, Maria Rooth, Danijela Rundqvist, Evelina Samuelsson, Therese Sjölander, Anna Vikman

United States
Chris Bailey, Laurie Baker, Karyn Bye, Julie Chu, Natalie Darwitz, Sara DeCosta, Tricia Dunn-Luoma, Cammi Granato, Courtney Kennedy, Andrea Kilbourne, Katie King, Shelley Looney, Sue Merz, A. J. Mleczko, Tara Mounsey, Jenny Schmidgall-Potter, Angela Ruggiero, Sarah Tueting, Lyndsay Wall, Krissy Wendell

References

rosters
2002